Langa ka Phalo (about 1705 - 1794) was a ruler of the Xhosa nation and reigned from 1740 until his death. Langa was born as to Phalo ka Tshiwo and is known to have had two sons Ngqeno ka Langa (1759) and Thole ka Langa.

Xhosa people
Rulers of the Mbalu
18th-century rulers in Africa